Graham Peak may refer to:
Graham Peak (Antarctica)
Graham Peak (Colorado)

Graham Peak (Idaho)
Graham Peak (Utah)

See also
Mount Graham, Arizona